Robert Wilson  was a Scottish footballer who played for Partick Thistle, mainly as a right half. He featured prominently for the Jags for four seasons, making 116 appearances in all competitions including the Glasgow Cup final of 1911, but very little is noted of any career thereafter – it was suggested that he joined Chelsea in 1913, but there is no record of him playing for the West London club in any official competitions.

Wilson was selected twice for the Scottish Football League XI, both against the Irish League XI in 1910 and 1911.

References

Year of birth unknown
Year of death unknown
Scottish footballers
Association football wing halves
Scottish Junior Football Association players
Maryhill F.C. players
Partick Thistle F.C. players
Scottish Football League players
Scottish Football League representative players
20th-century deaths